Nachhatar Singh Johal (born 1979) is an Indian sailor. He was born in Jalandhar, Punjab. He competed at the 2008 Summer Olympics in Beijing, where he placed 23rd in the Finn class.

References

External links

1979 births
Living people
Sportspeople from Jalandhar
Indian male sailors (sport)
Olympic sailors of India
Sailors at the 2008 Summer Olympics – Finn